A list of tree species, grouped generally by biogeographic realm and specifically by bioregions, and shade tolerance. Shade-tolerant species are species that are able to thrive in the shade, and in the presence of natural competition by other plants. Shade-intolerant species require full sunlight and little or no competition. Intermediate shade-tolerant trees fall somewhere in between the two.

Americas

Nearctic realm

Eastern North America
Shade tolerant
 Abies balsamea, Balsam Fir
 Acer negundo, Boxelder
 Acer saccharum, Sugar Maple
 Aesculus spp., Buckeyes
 Carpinus caroliniana, American Hornbeam
 Carya laciniosa, Shellbark Hickory
 Chamaecyparis thyoides, Atlantic White Cypress or Atlantic White Cedar
 Cornus florida, Flowering Dogwood
 Diospyros spp., Persimmon
 Fagus grandifolia, American Beech
 Ilex opaca, American Holly
 Magnolia grandiflora, Southern Magnolia
 Morus rubra, Red Mulberry
 Nyssa spp., Tupelos
 Ostrya virginiana, Eastern Hophornbeam
 Picea glauca, White Spruce
 Picea mariana, Black Spruce
 Picea rubens, Red Spruce
 Tilia americana, Basswood
 Thuja occidentalis, Northern White Cedar
 Tsuga canadensis, Eastern Hemlock

Intermediate shade tolerant
 Acer rubrum, Red Maple 
 Acer saccharinum, Silver Maple
 Betula alleghaniensis, Yellow Birch
 Betula lenta, Sweet Birch
 Carya spp., Hickories (except for Shellbark)
 Castanea dentata, American Chestnut
 Celtis occidentalis, Hackberry
 Fraxinus americana, White Ash
 Fraxinus pennsylvanica, Green Ash
 Fraxinus nigra, Black Ash
 Magnolia spp., Magnolias
 Quercus alba, White Oak
 Quercus macrocarpa, Bur Oak
 Quercus nigra, Water Oak
 Quercus rubra, Northern  Red Oak
 Pinus elliottii, Slash Pine
 Pinus strobus, Eastern White Pine
 Taxodium distichum, Bald Cypress
 Ulmus americana, American Elm
 Ulmus thomasii, Rock Elm

Shade intolerant
 Betula papyrifera, Paper Birch
 Betula populifolia, Gray Birch
 Catalpa spp., Catalpas
 Carya illinoinensis, Pecan
 Gymnocladus dioicus, Kentucky Coffee Tree
 Juglans cinerea, Butternut
 Juglans nigra, Black Walnut
 Juniperus virginiana, Eastern Red Cedar
 Larix laricina, Tamarack
 Liriodendron tulipifera, Yellow poplar
 Maclura pomifera, Osage Orange
 Pinus banksiana, Jack Pine
 Pinus echinata, Shortleaf Pine
 Pinus palustris, Longleaf Pine
 Pinus resinosa, Red Pine
 Pinus rigida, Pitch Pine
 Pinus taeda, Loblolly pine
 Pinus virginiana, Virginia Pine
 Platanus occidentalis, Sycamore
 Populus deltoides, Eastern Cottonwood
 Populus grandidentata, Big-Tooth Aspen
 Populus tremuloides, Quaking Aspen
 Prunus pensylvanica, Pin Cherry
 Prunus serotina, Black Cherry
 Robinia pseudoacacia, Black Locust
 Salix spp., Willows
 Sassafras spp., Sassafras

Western North America
Shade tolerant
 Abies amabilis, Pacific Silver Fir
 Abies concolor, White Fir
 Abies grandis, Grand Fir
 Abies lasiocarpa, Alpine Fir
 Acer circinatum, Vine Maple
 Acer macrophyllum, Big-leaf Maple
 Arbutus arizonica, Arizona Madrone
 Arbutus menziesii, Pacific Madrone
 Arbutus xalapensis, Texas Madrone
 Cupressus nootkatensis, Nootka Cypress
 Calocedrus decurrens, California Incense-cedar
 Notholithocarpus densiflorus, Tan Oak
 Picea engelmannii, Engelmann Spruce
 Picea sitchensis, Sitka Spruce
 Quercus chrysolepis, Canyon Live Oak
 Sebastiania pavoniana, Mexican jumping bean
 Sequoia sempervirens, Coast Redwood
 Sequoiadendron giganteum, Giant Sequoia
 Taxus brevifolia, Pacific Yew
 Thuja plicata Western Red Cedar
 Torreya californica, California Torreya
 Tsuga heterophylla, Western Hemlock
 Tsuga mertensiana, Mountain Hemlock
 Umbellularia californica, California Laurel

Intermediate shade tolerant
 Abies magnifica, Red Fir
 Alnus rubra, Red Alder
 Cercis canadensis, Texas Redbud
 Chrysolepis spp., Golden Chinquapin
 Fraxinus latifolia, Oregon Ash
 Juniperus ashei, Ashe Juniper
 Picea pungens, Colorado Blue spruce
 Prunus mexicana, Mexican Plum
 Pinus lambertiana, Sugar Pine
 Pinus monticola Western White Pine
 Pinus radiata, Monterey Pine
 Pseudotsuga spp., Douglas-fir
 Quercus garryana, Oregon White Oak
 Quercus lobata, valley oak

Shade intolerant
 Abies procera, Noble Fir
 Juniperus californica, California Juniper
 Juniperus deppeana, Alligator Juniper
 Juniperus monosperma, One-seed Juniper
 Juniperus occidentalis, Western Juniper
 Juniperus osteosperma, Utah Juniper
 Juniperus scopulorum, Rocky Mountain Juniper
 Larix lyallii, Alpine Larch
 Larix occidentalis, Western Larch
 Pinus albicaulis, Whitebark Pine
 Pinus aristata, Rocky Mountains Bristlecone Pine
 Pinus attenuata, Knobcone Pine
 Pinus balfouriana, Foxtail Pine
 Pinus contorta, Lodgepole Pine
 Pinus coulteri, Coulter Pine
 Pinus flexilis, Limber Pine
 Pinus jeffreyi, Jeffrey Pine
 Pinus longaeva, Great Basin Bristlecone Pine
 Pinus muricata, Bishop Pine
 Pinus ponderosa, Ponderosa Pine
 Pinus sabineana, Gray Pine
 Pinus Ducampopinus spp., Piñon Pines
 Populus fremontii, Fremont Cottonwood
 Populus tremuloides, Quaking aspen

Eurasia

Palearctic realm

Central Europe
Shade tolerant
 Abies alba, European Silver Fir, especially shade tolerant
 Acer platanoides, Norway Maple
 Acer pseudoplatanus, Sycamore Maple
 Carpinus betulus, European Hornbeam
 Fagus sylvatica, European Beech, especially shade tolerant
 Ilex aquifolium, European Holly
 Ostrya carpinifolia, European Hop-Hornbeam
 Prunus avium, Wild Cherry
 Sorbus domestica, True Service Tree
 Sorbus torminalis, Wild Service Tree
 Taxus baccata, European Yew, especially shade tolerant
 Ulmus glabra, Wych Elm
 Ulmus laevis, European White Elm

Intermediate shade tolerant
 Acer campestre, Field Maple
 Acer monspessulanum, Montpellier Maple
 Acer opalus, Italian Maple
 Alnus glutinosa, Black Alder
 Alnus incana, Grey Alder
 Castanea sativa, Sweet Chestnut
 Fraxinus excelsior, European Ash
 Fraxinus ornus, Manna Ash
 Juglans regia, Common Walnut
 Mespilus germanica, Common Medlar
 Picea abies, Norway Spruce
 Pinus cembra, Swiss Pine
 Prunus padus, Bird Cherry
 Pyrus pyraster, European Wild Pear
 Quercus cerris, Turkey Oak
 Quercus petraea, Sessile Oak
 Sorbus aria, Whitebeam
 Sorbus aucuparia, European Rowan
 Sorbus intermedia, Swedish Whitebeam
 Tilia cordata, Small-leafed Linden
 Tilia platyphyllos, Large-leafed Linden
 Ulmus minor, Field Elm

Shade intolerant
 Betula pendula, Silver Birch, especially high light requirement
 Betula pubescens, Downy Birch
 Juniperus communis, Common Juniper
 Larix decidua, European Larch, especially high light requirement
 Malus sylvestris, European Crab Apple
 Pinus mugo, Mountain Pine
 Pinus nigra, European Black Pine
 Pinus sylvestris, Scots Pine
 Populus alba, Silver Poplar
 Populus nigra, Black Poplar
 Populus tremula, Aspen
 Quercus pubescens, Downy Oak
 Quercus robur, Pedunculate Oak
 Salix alba, White Willow
 Salix caprea, Goat Willow
 Salix fragilis, Crack Willow

External links

Tolerance of Tree Species
Silvics of North America, an encyclopedia of characteristics for around 200 tree species native to the United States published by the United States Forest Service.
Zeigerwerte der Pflanzen Mitteleuropas (German)

References

Trees
Shade-tolerance
Shade tolerance list
Shade tolerance